Steven J. Israel (born May 30, 1958) is an American political commentator, lobbyist, author, bookseller and former politician. He served as a U.S. Representative from New York from 2001 to 2017. A member of the Democratic Party, he was elected in  until 2013 and  until his retirement. At the time of his departure from Congress, his district included portions of northern Nassau County and Suffolk County on Long Island, as well as a small portion of Queens in New York City.

Israel chaired the Democratic Congressional Campaign Committee from 2011 to 2015 and Democratic Policy and Communications Committee from 2015 to 2017. Prior to his election to Congress, he served on the Huntington Town Board, starting 1993. After leaving Congress in 2017, Israel joined CNN as a political commentator. In 2019, he was appointed the inaugural director of the Institute of Politics and Global Affairs at Cornell University. , Israel also serves on the Board of Advisors for lobbying firm Michael Best Strategies.

Early life and career
Israel was born in Brooklyn and raised in the Long Island community of Levittown, New York. He attended Nassau Community College and Syracuse University for one year before graduating from George Washington University with a Bachelor of Arts in 1982.

After earning his bachelor's degree, Israel became a staff member for U.S. Representative Richard Ottinger. He was later elected to the town council in Huntington, New York, in 1993.

U.S. House of Representatives

Elections
After Rick Lazio left his House seat to run for the United States Senate in 2000, Israel was elected to his seat, receiving 48% of the vote, defeating Republican Joan Johnson, who received 34%, and four independent candidates. He was reelected seven times with relatively little difficulty, despite representing a swing district on paper.

On January 5, 2016, Israel announced that he would not seek reelection in November 2016.

Committee assignments
 Committee on Appropriations
 Subcommittee on Energy and Water Development
 Subcommittee on State, Foreign Operations, and Related Programs
 Subcommittee on Military Construction, Veterans Affairs, and Related Agencies

Caucus membership
 Co-chair and founder of Congressional Center Aisle Caucus
 House Cancer Caucus (Co-chair)
 Long Island Sound Caucus (Co-chair)

Party leadership
 Assistant Democratic Whip
 House Democratic Caucus Task Force On Defense and the Military (Chair)
 House Democratic Study Group on National Security Policy (Co-chair)

Tenure 
Israel voted to authorize George W. Bush to use military force in Iraq, even though more than 60 per cent of his Democratic colleagues in the House voted against the bill.

In his second term, Israel was tapped for a leadership position as Assistant Whip. In his third term, Israel was appointed to chair the House Democratic Caucus Task Force on Defense and Military, a group of 15 Democratic House members who reach out to the defense community and advise the House Democratic leadership on military policy.

In 2006, in response to Jimmy Carter's book Palestine: Peace Not Apartheid, Israel said, "I disagree with President Carter fundamentally. The reason for the Palestinian plight is the Palestinians."

Israel supported a study on the feasibility of switching from Tuesday to weekend voting.

Occupy Wall Street
Israel's support for Occupy Wall Street drew criticism from conservatives, who claimed the movement harbored "anti-Semitic" elements. In response Israel pointed to his support for the nation of Israel as well as his own Jewish heritage.

DCCC chairman
As an ally of Nancy Pelosi, Israel was mentioned in 2010 as a possible successor to Chris Van Hollen, the chairman of the DCCC; he declined to speak about it until after the midterms were over, saying he was "just completely focused on supporting Nancy Pelosi."

It was reported that Pelosi's selection of Israel to head the DCCC had much to do with the district he represents, where "Democrats hold a modest registration edge but independents decide elections." Israel had gained respect through fundraising and recruiting candidates for the campaign committee. Israel is one of the few Democrats who has run campaign ads in defense of his vote on health care.

Policy positions

Abortion
Israel has said he supports legal abortions in cases of rape, incest, and threat to the life of the mother, though he does not support abortions being legal in all cases. He has voted against bills that would prohibit federal funding for abortions, against a bill that would eliminate federal funding for Planned Parenthood, an organization that provides abortions, and against the Abortion Pain Act, which would have prevented abortions after 20 weeks of pregnancy. Since 2004 he has consistently received 100% ratings from the pro-choice groups NARAL, Planned Parenthood, and the National Family Planning & Reproductive Health Association, as well as a 0% rating from the National Right to Life Committee.

Economics
On July 4, 2013, Israel announced legislation that would require all U.S. national parks to sell merchandise that is Made in the USA.

Gun issues
Israel supports increased regulation on gun ownership. He voted against several bills and amendments which would decrease federal regulation of safety precautions of guns and decrease federal regulations on the sale of firearms. He also cosponsored the 2009 "No Fly, No Buy" Act, stating "Gun safety measures like the 'No Fly, No Buy' Act should be a no-brainer for every member of Congress. It's common sense legislation." He has received 0% ratings from the pro-gun rights NRA and the Gun Owners of America, as well as 100% ratings from the pro-gun control Brady Campaign to Prevent Gun Violence and the Coalition to Stop Gun Violence. Israel was an original cosponsor of the bill To extend the Undetectable Firearms Act of 1988 for 10 years (H.R. 3626; 113th Congress), which passed the House on December 3, 2013. The bill allowed for a ten-year extension of the Undetectable Firearms Act of 1988, but did not expand any of its provisions (related to plastic guns).

Health care
Israel voted for the 2010 Affordable Care Act and against several bills repealing it.

LGBT rights
Israel supports same-sex marriage. In a June 2009 press release he stated, "I'm proud of what Iowa, Maine, Massachusetts, New Hampshire, Connecticut, and Vermont have done for marriage equality. I hope that my home state of New York will soon follow." New York legalized same-sex marriage in 2011.

He voted for the repeal of Don't ask, don't tell and for the Employment Non-Discrimination Act.

He has a 100% rating from the pro-LGBTQ rights Human Rights Campaign and a 0% rating from the Family Research Council.

Social media
In October 2022, Israel joined the Council for Responsible Social Media project launched by Issue One to address the negative mental, civic, and public health impacts of social media in the United States co-chaired by former House Democratic Caucus Leader Dick Gephardt and former Massachusetts Lieutenant Governor Kerry Healey.

J Street controversy
Steve Israel was an honorary member of the gala host committee for a Gala dinner on October 27, 2009, by J Street, a liberal nonprofit lobbying group. In the weeks leading up to the Gala dinner, those aligned with the Likud, the political party of Israeli Prime Minister, Benjamin Netanyahu, criticized Steve Israel and those supporting J Street. The Weekly Standard blogger Michael Goldfarb called the J Street dinner an "anti-Israel bash." In response, Steve Israel's spokeswoman Lindsay Hamilton state, "It's absurd that this has become a controversy [...] The Congressman agreed to be on the gala host committee. That doesn't mean he agrees with every viewpoint of every speaker at the event".

Electoral history
New York election law allows for fusion voting, where a candidate can run as a member of multiple parties. In 2000 Israel ran only as a Democrat in his winning bid for Congress, but since 2002 he has also run as the candidate for the Independence Party and the Working Families Party. In 2000 the Republican candidate ran only as a Republican, but since 2002, every Republican has also run as the candidate for the Conservative Party of New York.

|-
| colspan=10 |
|-
!Year
!Winning candidate
!Party
!Pct
!Opponent
!Party
!Pct
|-
|2000
| |Steve Israel
| |Democratic
| |48%
| |Joan B. Johnson
| |Republican
| |35%
|-
|2002
| |Steve Israel
| |Democratic
| |58%
| |Joseph P. Finley
| |Republican
| |40%
|-
|2004
| |Steve Israel
| |Democratic
| |67%
| |Richard Hoffmann
| |Republican
| |33%
|-
|2006
| |Steve Israel
| |Democratic
| |70%
| |John W. Bugler
| |Republican
| |30%
|-
|2008
| |Steve Israel
| |Democratic
| |67%
| |Frank J. Stalzer
| |Republican
| |33%
|-
|2010
| |Steve Israel
| |Democratic
| |56%
| |John Gomez
| |Republican
| |43%
|-
|2012
| |Steve Israel
| |Democratic
| |58%
| |Stephen Labate
| |Republican
| |42%
|-
|2014
| |Steve Israel
| |Democratic
| |54%
| |Grant Lally
| |Republican
| |45%
|-

Personal life
Israel has two adult daughters. He has written two novels of political satire: The Global War on Morris (2014) and Big Guns (2018).

The 2012 sale of Israel's marital home was the subject of minor controversy, after it was discovered that he had received financial contributions from lenders who also gave him a favorable deal on a short sale of the home in the wake of his separation from his wife Marlene Budd.

In November 2021, Israel opened a bookstore in Oyster Bay, NY named after former President and town resident Theodore Roosevelt.

Bibliography

See also
 List of Jewish members of the United States Congress

References

External links

 

|-

|-

|-

|-

|-

|-

1958 births
20th-century American politicians
21st-century American male writers
21st-century American novelists
21st-century American politicians
American lobbyists
American male novelists
American satirical novelists
Cornell University faculty
CNN people
Democratic Party members of the United States House of Representatives from New York (state)
George Washington University alumni
Jewish members of the United States House of Representatives
Living people
New York (state) city council members
Politicians from Brooklyn
People from Wantagh, New York
Politicians from Suffolk County, New York
Nassau Community College alumni
Novelists from New York (state)
Syracuse University alumni
People from Huntington, New York
People from Oyster Bay Cove, New York